Wang Qiang (born 1963) is an air force general of the People's Liberation Army (PLA) who currently serves as the commander of the Northern Theater Command. Wang was promoted to major general in July 2014 and to lieutenant general in June 2019.

Biography
Wang was born in Rong County, Zigong, Sichuan province in 1963. He served as commander of the 12th Division of the Air Force of Jinan Military Region before serving as its deputy chief of staff in July 2013. In January 2016, he was commissioned in the Western Theater Command where he was assigned as deputy chief of staff and chief of staff of its Air Force. In July 2018, he was promoted to deputy commander of the Western Theater Command and concurrently serves as commander of its Air Force since April 2020. In September 2022, he was promoted to commander of the Northern Theater Command, replacing Li Qiaoming.

He was promoted to the rank of major general (shaojiang) in July 2014, lieutenant general (zhongjiang) in June 2019, and general (shangjiang) in September 2022.

Wang was a full member of the 20th Central Committee of the Communist Party of China.

References

1963 births
Living people
People from Rong County, Sichuan
People's Liberation Army generals from Sichuan